Oćevija is a village in the municipality of Vareš, Bosnia and Herzegovina. It was formerly known as Očevlje Gornje.

Demographics 
According to the 2013 census, its population was 79.

References

Populated places in Vareš